The Union of Jewish Students of the United Kingdom and Ireland (UJS) represents Jewish students in the United Kingdom and Ireland. It is a member of the World Union of Jewish Students (WUJS) and the European Union of Jewish Students (EUJS) and an associate member of the National Union of Students, and is represented on the Board of Deputies of British Jews. The President for 2022/23 is Joel Rosen.

History

Launch
The IUJF (Inter University Jewish Federation) was the creation in 1919 of the Manchester Jewish Association. They saw a growing pride in the Jewish Community and believed it was appropriate for Jewish students to have a national organisation to co-ordinate the activities of Jewish student Societies and represent Jewish students at a national level.

The first step was a conference in Manchester on 17 July 1919 at which four Jewish societies were represented: Manchester, Liverpool, Leeds and Oxford. Although not represented initially, the London University Jewish Society subsequently took an active and eventually a leading role.

Early years
With the rise to power in Germany of the Nazi Party, many Jewish students had their studies disrupted and sought refuge in non-occupied Europe and elsewhere; the International Students Service was in the forefront of providing advice to these displaced students and financial assistance was made available from communal funds. The Federation was active in supporting these efforts; almost £2,000 was raised from University students in Britain.

By 1946, the following Universities had societies affiliated to the Federation, in addition to those already mentioned: Belfast, Birmingham, Cambridge, University College, Cardiff, Dublin, Durham, Edinburgh, Glasgow, London, Reading and Sheffield.

The two main activities of the Federation, from its inception, were an annual Summer School and an Annual Conference, held in the winter vacation.

Throughout its existence, the IUJF was involved with the Jewish community. It was represented on the Board of Deputies of British Jews and the Zionist Federation and had an ongoing liaison with Jewish Youth Study Groups.

For the almost fifty years from its foundation until the creation of the Hillel Foundation, the IUJF had no office, no staff, no sabbatical officers and no assured budget other than money that students could raise themselves. The Federation was run from the rooms of the then Chairman or Secretary; all activities were organized by the students themselves on a voluntary basis; from time to time, small subventions were obtained from the general community.

Expansion
It was the partnership with which B’nai B’rith set up the Hillel Foundation which provided the IUJF with its first permanent office and its first professional assistance. This enabled the Federation and its successor, UJS, to increase its works.

The organization was renamed UJS in 1973.

Activities and values
As of 2021, UJS represents approximately 8,500 students, with 4,000-4,500 being members of its 69 affiliated Jewish Societies (J-Socs) on individual campuses. Expenditure in 2020/21 was under £1m. It states that its core values are: cross-communalism, peer-leadership, representation and engagement with Israel. Its communal partners and supporters include the Jewish Leadership Council, UJIA and the Community Security Trust.

It provides training and funding for individual J-Socs; campaigns on specific issues; offers members the opportunity to participate in networking events, master classes and a summer placement scheme; runs national events to bring together Jewish students, including the JUEFA Cup football tournament, the UJS training Summit, the UJS Conference, the UJS Student Awards, Shabbat UK and Jewniversity Challenge, and; works with universities to secure Jewish student accommodation and spaces for J-Soc activities as well as sourcing kosher food and students' other religious needs. It also organises a range of trips to Israel.

It has been active within the National Union of Students, including its Anti-Racism and Anti-Fascism campaigns. It has supported the campaigns of Wes Streeting, Aaron Porter, and Shakira Martin for the role of NUS President in 2008, 2010, and 2017, respectively. UJS funds delegations of Students’ Union leaders to visit Israel.

In April 2019, the UJS called on Sheffield University to "take all actions necessary" against a lecturer who had signed a petition in support of suspended MP Chris Williamson. In October 2019, the Union of Jewish Students demanded that the University of Nottingham cancel a planned lecture by Williamson.

Past Leadership
The UJS President is elected by Jewish students to represent their voices within the community, universities, colleges and wider society.

See also
Hillel International
British Jews

References

External links
Union of Jewish Students Official website
 

Jewish organisations based in the United Kingdom
Jewish youth organizations
Jews and Judaism in the United Kingdom
Jews and Judaism in Ireland
Zionist youth movements
Student religious organisations in the United Kingdom
National Union of Students (United Kingdom) factions
Student organizations established in 1919